The Korea Army Training Center (abbreviated KATC; Hangul: 육군훈련소) is a South Korean military training institution for the Republic of Korea Army basic training. It is one of the subordinate elements of the Republic of Korea Army Training & Doctrine Command (South Korea). It was established in 1951 during the Korean War, by order of the South Korean president Syngman Rhee. The recruits get deployed to their designated units after receiving basic military training at the KATC.

A summary of the military system 
Article 39(1) of the Republic of Korea's Constitution states that all people have the duty of national defense under the conditions specified in the Constitution. The Military Duty Law, mandated by the Constitution, states that all male Korean nationals must fully fulfill their military service duties, as stated by the Constitution and Article 3(1) of this Law.

As a result, under the universal conscription system, all South Korean male citizens between the ages of 18 and 35 are compelled to serve in the military. Recruited troops often undertake short-term basic military training to become elite soldiers, with the majority of manual activity. The service is for a defined period of time, after which soldiers are moved to reserve units. After finishing their military duty, the reserves just get on with their lives in peacetime until they are called up again in an emergency or wartime. New recruits train for five weeks on active duty and three weeks on supplementary duty before becoming private soldiers

History 
During the Korean War, there were training centers from the 1st to the 7th, and it took about two weeks to put it on the frontline.
The 1st Training Center was at Moseulpo, Jeju Island, Seoguipo, and the 3rd training center was located in Geoje, South Gyeongsang Province. KATC was established on November 1, 1951 under the name "2nd Training Center". In commemoration of its established, President Syngman Rhee gave it the pen name "Yeonmudae(Hangul: 연무대, Hanja: 鍊武臺)"

 January 1, 1956: Merged 1st Training center
 February 1, 1999: Changed from 2st Training center to Korea Army Training Center

Introduction to active duty five-week training (현역) 
1) Donghwa education (동화교욱):

A three-day preparatory session in which novices acclimate to the training center before beginning fullfledged training. They spend time listening to instructions regarding procedure routines, official names, living regulations at the training center, and completing out surveys, among other things.

-Enlistment ceremony (입소식) :

This is the first military event in which a civilian enters the military world to become a soldier, leaving loved ones such as parents, siblings, and sisters behind.

-Personal items payment (개인물품지급) :

Soldiers' individual body dimensions are scanned with a 3D automatic body dimensional scanner in order for them to receive appropriate equipment. Personal equipment is given, including combat suits, combat boots, underwear, sportswear, and military essentials like as toothpaste, toothbrushes, and tissues.

-Physical Examination (신체검사) :

In addition to basic tests such as weight and height, a thorough analysis of individual diseases and body constitution is conducted.

-Special aptitude examination ( 특기적성검사) :

Individual specialties are reviewed to determine whether it is possible to perform duties as a special forces soldier in the future.

2) Week 1~2 —> Establishing a Basic Military Posture (군인기본자세 확립)

 Gun acquisition (총기수여식) :

It is time to receive a soldier's most valuable personal possession: a gun. Soldiers must be ready to treasure it as much as their own lives, because guns are the weapons soldiers must always carry in wartime to fight enemies and protect themselves. One must never let go of a gun once it has been entrusted to you.

 Entrance ceremony (입소식) :

A soldier makes a pledge as a trainee to undergo five weeks of training and become a private honorable soldier.

 Mental power education (정신전력 교육) :

Soldiers will be instructed to develop basic military posture. During this time, troops learn about military spirit through education on national, security, and enemy perspectives. They are taught what kind of country the Republic of Korea is, why it is necessary to join the military, and what kind of country the biggest opponent, North Korea, is.

 Formal discipline (제식훈련) :

Over the course of two weeks, trainees will acquire basic military posture, mental power, military spirit, national point of view, security, and so on. They will learn everything there is to know about a soldier's basic mental attitude, including how to walk, salute, and execute military etiquette.

3) Week 3~5 —> Basic combat skills preparation (기본전투기술구비)

 Operation and management of rifles (소총의 조작 및 관리) :

Trainees now are shown how to use and handle guns, as well as personal firearm characteristics, mission operation mastery, and management skills.

 Shooting drill (사격술 훈련):

During shooting training, soldiers learn how to dismantle a gun in case it malfunctions, along with how to shoot, aim, and focus between gunshots. Following this training, there will be range shooting practice. Since the bullets used in shooting are live ammunition, it is critical to carefully follow the instructor's instructions and be prepared for accidents.

 Guard training (경계) :

It is the responsibility of judging whether a suspicious person is trying to enter the unit or making suspicious moves at a guard checkpoint. It is a critical task because it is the first defense line against the opponent. A typical exercise is walking along the wire fences or looking around at a high guard post. Soldiers are trained how to look around and behave when someone approaches them.

 First-aid training (구급법) :

Training to learn basic first aid skills in order to help injured soldiers in war. If a comrade sustains an injury to his leg or arm, he learns how to splint or bandage it, how to stop bleeding with a wooden stick, how to support, how to carry a piggyback, how to create a stretcher, and how to perform CPR. This education is valuable since it can be utilized in the actual world.

 CBR training (화생방) :

CBR training is known for being the most hard and unpleasant of all. It teaches how to utilize gas masks to avoid gas absorption in the eventuality of an enemy chemical bomb attack. It is considered as the most painful training since soldiers are required to remove their masks and face the gas bare-faced. Shortness of breath, tears, and a runny nose are all symptoms of gas exposure. Unfortunately, it hurts so much that it feels like an hour. There are some trainees who find it difficult to endure and leave. This emphasizes the dangers of chemical attacks and the importance of wearing gas masks.

 Grenade training (수류탄) :

Soldiers become accustomed with hand grenades and their composition, structure, and specifications during this time, learn the instructions, and eventually gain the ability to effectively overpower the opponent in battle. Each step of training is accomplished by completing a certain task, advancing, and finally capturing the enemy's position. It is one of the training exercises that requires a lot of strength, and eventually troops will be able to effectively overpower the adversary in battle.

 Zero shooting (영점 사격) :

Shooting exercises to improve accuracy when hitting the target ,and impact points at a constant range

 Record shooting (기록 사격) :

Even more practice to understand and master the principles of hitting targets by range.

 Individual combat (각개전투) :

A training to thoroughly master accuracy of direction, changing terrains, while facing various situations. Novices will show what they have learned in a wide range of situations and overcome obstacles with various strategies for moving at night. Soldiers with these abilities will be able to catch the enemy's position and respond appropriately to the circumstances.

 Full march of troops (완전군장행군) :

Soldiers march 20 kilometers around the training camp while carrying a 20 kg full-armament backpack containing blankets, combat shoes, and shovels to confront unexpected situations that may occur on the battlefield. This type of activity promotes combat spirit and pushes troops to their utmost combat strength.

 Completion ceremony (수료식):

Soldiers receive a shiny private badge at the end of the five weeks of training as a token of their successful completion of the training. Families are allowed to visit their son after the completion ceremony.

 Transfer (전속):

Soldiers are allocated to a new unit following the completion ceremony. The current private soldiers now have left the training camp and then are assigned to a unit or military school.

Introduction to Supplementary military service " (보충역) 

 Donghwa education period (동화교육) :-Enlistment ceremony (입영행사)
 Week 1—> Establishing a Basic Military Posture  (군인기본자세 확립) :  -Personal items payment (개인물품지급) -Gun acquisition (총기수여식) -Entrance ceremony (입소식) -Mental preparation (정신교육) -Formal discipline (제식훈련)
 Weeks 2~3 —> Basic combat skills preparation (기본전투기술구비) :-Operation and management of rifles (소총의 조작 및 관리) -Shooting drill (사격술 훈련) -First-aid training (구급법) -Nuclear and chemical protection (핵 및 화생방방호) : Preparation against chemical, biological, and nuclear attacks by the enemies. Training on the use of gas masks is required in order to carry out duties. -Grenade training (수류탄) -Zero shooting (영점 사격) -Ground basic shooting (기초 사격) -Individual battles (각개전투) -Full march of troops (완전군장행군) -Completion ceremony (수료식)

References 

Training establishments of the South Korean Army